Alexander Leone Lally "Bud" Cook (November 20, 1907 – November 13, 1993) was a Canadian ice hockey centre forward who played 50 games over three seasons in the National Hockey League for the Boston Bruins, Ottawa Senators, and St. Louis Eagles. The rest of his career was spent in the minor leagues, primarily in the International American Hockey League/American Hockey League, and retired in 1947.

Bud was the brother of Bill Cook and Bun Cook.

Regular season and playoffs

External links 

1907 births
1993 deaths
Boston Bruins players
Boston Cubs players
Canadian expatriate ice hockey players in the United States
Canadian ice hockey centres
Cleveland Barons (1937–1973) players
Cleveland Falcons players
Detroit Olympics (IHL) players
Eastern Hockey League players
Ice hockey people from Ontario
Sportspeople from Kingston, Ontario
Oakland Oaks (PCHL) players
Ottawa Senators (1917) players
Ottawa Senators (original) players
Providence Reds players
St. Louis Eagles players
United States Coast Guard Cutters players